Fahad Al-Munaif is a Saudi Arabian footballer who plays for Bisha as a forward.

Honours
Al Shabab
Saudi Professional League: 2011-12

References

External links
soccerpunter.com Profile
football.com Profile
footballdatabase.eu Profile

1989 births
Living people
Saudi Arabian footballers
Al-Shoulla FC players
Al Nassr FC players
Al-Fayha FC players
Al-Shabab FC (Riyadh) players
Al-Faisaly FC players
Al-Qadsiah FC players
Ohod Club players
Al-Sharq Club players
Al-Nairyah Club players
Bisha FC players
Saudi First Division League players
Saudi Professional League players
Saudi Second Division players
Association football forwards